Leslie Charles Nicholson was an Australian politician who represented the South Australian House of Assembly seat of Light from 1960 to 1962 for the Liberal and Country League.

He was previously the chairman of the District Council of Eudunda from 1950 to 1951.

References

 

Members of the South Australian House of Assembly
Liberal and Country League politicians
Mayors of places in South Australia